Ivan Igorevich Khutorskoy (February 17, 1983, Moscow – November 16, 2009, Moscow) was a RASH skinhead, nicknamed "Bonecrusher," who was a prominent member of the Russian anti-fascist movement. He was murdered in his home in a suburb of Moscow.

Background
Khutorskoy was known for working security at anti-fascist concerts and at press conferences by Stanislav Markelov. Trained in Sambo and arm-wrestling, Khutorskoy was an experienced street fighter and took part in multiple beatings of people, particularly neo-Nazis, on the streets of Moscow. Videos of some of the beatings were posted online. He also was known for organizing self-defense classes for anti-fascists.

He was shot by a pistol in his own doorway on November 16, 2009. The group  (BORN,  (БОРН)) claimed responsibility for the killing, although several media outlets have questioned the existence of that organization. There are even claims that the entire organization is "purely comic-opera character."

See also
Antifaschistische Aktion
List of unsolved murders
Red and Anarchist Skinheads
 
 Combat Terrorist Organization
 NS/WP Crew
 The Savior (paramilitary organization)

Footnotes

External links 
A gentle bonecrusher – The life and death of Ivan Khutorskoy
Anti-fascist activist shot dead in Moscow

1983 births
2009 deaths
Deaths by firearm in Russia
Male murder victims
Murdered anarchists
People murdered in Russia
Russian anarchists
Russian anti-fascists
Skinhead
Unsolved murders in Russia